Integrated College Dungannon (ICD) is an integrated secondary school situated in Dungannon, County Tyrone and is attended by students from ages 11–18. It is an all-ability College including grammar entry. It has been open since 1995.

Context
Integrated Education is a Northern Ireland phenomenon, where traditionally schools were sectarian, either run as Catholic schools or Protestant schools. On as parental request, a school could apply to 'transition' to become Grant Maintained offering 30% of the school places to students from the minority community. Lagan College was the first integrated school to open in 1981.

History

Many pupils transferred from the Armagh Integrated College when it closed in 2009.

Site
The college has been enhanced with a new £2.3m sports hall. It was designed by Mc Adam Design architects and delivered by Woodvale Construction. The site has an accredited 3G pitch.

Notable former pupils
 Colin Morgan, film, television, theatre and radio actor

See also
 List of integrated schools in Northern Ireland
 List of secondary schools in Northern Ireland

References

External links
Integrated College Dungannon web site
Inspection Report 2011

Dungannon
Secondary schools in County Tyrone
Integrated schools in County Tyrone
1995 establishments in Northern Ireland
Educational institutions established in 1995